Massacration is a fictional American heavy metal band created by Brazilian humorists and musicians Bruno Sutter (as vocalist Detonator), Fausto Fanti (as lead guitarist Blondie Hammett), Marco Antônio Alves (as bassist Metal Avenger), Adriano Silva (as rhythm guitarist Headmaster) and Felipe Torres (as drummer Jimmy the Hammer), all of them part of the comedy troupe Hermes & Renato. Self-described by the Portuguese-language epithet "a banda da galera" (roughly translated into English as "the people's band") and frequently compared to fellow semi-fictional act Spinal Tap, by whom they were heavily influenced, Massacration is known for their humorous lyrics (sung by Sutter in a distinctive, over-the-top falsetto and written in a mixture of a comically broken English and Portuguese) which poke fun, in a light-hearted and good-natured way, on clichés of the heavy metal subculture and the "metalhead/headbanger" stereotype, lampooning both musically and aesthetically famous bands of the genre such as Black Sabbath, Metallica, Iron Maiden, Helloween, Judas Priest, Manowar, Sepultura and Angra, among others. Sutter has also began a successful career performing as Detonator outside Massacration in 2013, with the spin-off project Detonator e as Musas do Metal.

Owing to the fact that Silva and Torres are the only bandmembers not to be actual musicians (despite appearing in the group's music videos and promotional pictures), the former's rhythm guitar parts were handled by Fausto Fanti (and later by his brother Franco, who would replace him as "Red Head Hammett" following his death in 2014); the latter's drum parts were provided by a different array of guest musicians.

History

Fictional history
MTV Brasil and Hermes & Renato produced a short, 10-minute mockumentary showcasing the band's fictional backstory in 2005 to promote the release of their then-upcoming debut Gates of Metal Fried Chicken of Death. Massacration's origins trace back to 1979 (in a nod to the same year when Spinal Tap was formed) in the United States, when petty criminal and talented guitarist John "Blondie" Hammett (played by Fausto Fanti), after being arrested for the sixth time, became cellmates with quail smuggler and castrato singer David "Detonator" Sutter (played by Bruno Sutter); united by their mutual tastes on rock and heavy metal music, they soon developed a very strong friendship. Having renounced crime following their release from prison, the duo got acquainted with up-and-coming tambourine player Donald Polai (played by Lecuk Ishida, a producer for MTV at the time who occasionally made one-time appearances for Hermes & Renato's sketches) and they decided to form a band, Death Mania; the trio performed their first gig at a bar south of Phoenix, Arizona, but Death Mania only lasted for a day as Polai soon after committed suicide, apparently influenced by the group's "ominous" name.

Crestfallen over the death of their friend, Sutter and Hammett sunk into a deep depression; they eventually became regular customers of popular Italian restaurant Massas Crézio (or "Crézio's Pasta"), where they would constantly binge-eat to the point of growing morbidly obese. Touched by their situation, the restaurant's owner, Italian Brazilian immigrant Crézio, intervened and conceded them a rent-free room at his house where they could live and rehearse until recovering their spirits, and so they overcame their depression and lost all the extra weight they had gained. Motivated to start anew and form another group, they put an ad in a local newspaper looking for personnel; coincidentally, the spots were filled by Crézio's employees Jimmy "The Hammer" Lombardo (played by Felipe Torres), Klaus "Headmaster" Bissonette (played by Adriano Silva) and Rick "Metal Avenger" Banday (played by Marco Antônio Alves). As a homage to Crézio and his restaurant the band was initially christened Massascrézio, but as time went by the name was changed to Massacrézio, Massacrétion and, finally, Massacration.

Shortly after their very first show, Massacration was approached by world-renowned record producer Dick Dornelle (played by then-Hermes & Renato member Gil Brother), who had previously worked with bands and artists such as Queen, Iron Maiden and Michael Jackson. They then signed to his label Shusi Records and spent the following two months (due to the song's "high level of complexity") at a studio in North Carolina to record their first single, "Metal Massacre Attack (Aruê Aruô)", which was a critical and commercial hit, debuting at number one on Billboard Hot 100 – anachronistically in front of contemporary names like Usher, Maroon 5 and Gavin DeGraw – and awarding them a "Gremlin Award". However, success quickly went to Sutter's head and he began squandering the band's fortune on frivolities and inhalants (to which he became strongly addicted), what led to a deterioration of the relations between him and his colleagues. Following a racist joke made by a heavily intoxicated Sutter during a benefit concert in Somalia, the remaining members of Massacration expelled him from the band and returned to their former jobs at Crézio's restaurant, effectively ending the group's activities.

Many years later, Sutter, now a homeless beggar living in obscurity, ran into Hammett by chance; instantly recognizing themselves, they settled their differences and decided to reunite Massacration, recording the singles "Metal Bucetation" and "Metal Milkshake", the latter of which selling over 12 billion copies and awarding them both a "Sixfold Diamond" certification by the RIAA and the elusive "Nobel Prize in Music", which had only been previously given to Mozart, Beethoven and Frank Sinatra. Pleased by their massive success, the "God of Metal" decided to adopt Sutter as his legitimate son, and created for him and his bandmates the paradise of "Metal Land", where they continued to live since.

Amidst Massacration's 2012–16 hiatus, Bruno Sutter gave an interview to newspaper Folha de S.Paulo in-character as Detonator in 2014, explaining that, motivated by the success of the TV series The Walking Dead, zombies invaded Metal Land and he was forced to escape (in an allusion to the plot of his then-recently released rock opera Metal Folclore: The Zoeira Never Ends...); he and his bandmates were separated, and Blondie Hammett was unfortunately killed during the zombies' raid. When they reunited safely, in 2016, Blondie was replaced by his long-lost brother Red Head Hammett so that they could continue performing.

Real history
Massacration (initially written as Massacrassion) was conceived in the early 2000s by the Brazilian comedy troupe Hermes & Renato, who at the time had their own sketch comedy television show broadcast by now-defunct MTV Brasil. Even though the band's first televised appearance dates from 2002, it would not be until 2004 when they released their first actual song, accompanied by a music video, "Metal Massacre Attack (Aruê Aruô)"; the success of the music video prompted them to produce more, for the songs "Metal Bucetation" and "Metal Milkshake", and soon after they began performing their first shows, accompanied by then-Sepultura drummer Igor Cavalera (under the pseudonym "El Covero") as a live musician.

In July 2005 they announced their debut, Kings of Metal Fried Chicken of Death, whose title was subsequently changed to Gates of Metal Fried Chicken of Death; it was initially made available for streaming at MTV Brasil's official website on October 4 and released physically through Deckdisc six days later. The album counted with guest appearances by humorist Sérgio Mallandro and Ratos de Porão vocalist João Gordo (who also produced it under the pseudonym "Rick Rubinho", parodying Rick Rubin), and was critically acclaimed upon its release; according to 2006 data, it sold over 40,000 copies. Massacration's success then led them to appear in other MTV programs, such as the humorous football competition Rockgol and the animated series ; from 2005 to 2006 they also hosted their own music video program on the network, Total Massacration.

In 2007 the group began work on a follow-up album, Good Blood Headbanguers, but after a series of delays it was only released on October 10, 2009 through EMI; its cover art was officially unveiled to the public three days prior, alongside an outtake from Gates of Metal Fried Chicken of Death, "Anal Weapon War". Good Blood Headbanguers was produced by Roy Z, known for his work with other metal artists, and counted with a guest appearance by brega singer Falcão on the track "The Mummy"; however, it was not as well received as its predecessor.

In 2012, coinciding with Bruno Sutter's departure from Hermes & Renato (then called "Banana Mecânica"), he put Massacration on hold, explaining that "one shouldn't keep on repeating the same joke". At the time, fans speculated that Sutter's decision was influenced by his then-girlfriend (and future fiancée) , who received the pejorative nickname of "Yoko Ono" amongst them. Expressing his desire to focus on a more "female-centric" project, he founded in 2013 a new band based around his "Detonator" character, Detonator e as Musas do Metal, of which he is the sole male member; their debut album, the rock opera Metal Folclore: The Zoeira Never Ends..., came out the following year.

On July 30, 2014, guitarist Fausto Fanti was found dead in his apartment after committing suicide by hanging.

After a four-year hiatus, on May 20, 2016, the band reunited for an award-winning McDonald's commercial promoting their Grand Big Mac hamburger, in which they performed a new song, "Grand Pedido" – a heavy metal cover of the chain's famous "two all-beef patties" jingle. Fausto Fanti's brother Franco, who had replaced him in Hermes & Renato the year prior, also took his position as the band's guitarist under the stage name "Red Head Hammett"; Angra and Shaman drummer Ricardo Confessori, and bassist Marco Klein, also joined them as guest musicians under the respective pseudonyms of "El Perro Loco" and "El Mudo". On December 20, 2016, Sutter confirmed that Massacration had officially returned to active, and that they intended to release more music in the future.

On June 1, 2017, the band released a new single, "Metal MILF", alongside a music video which counted with a guest appearance by model and DJ Sabrina Boing Boing. Later that year their first live album/DVD, Live Metal Espancation, came out amidst overwhelmingly positive reception, being chosen by magazine Roadie Crew the best metal DVD of 2017.

2019 saw the release of another single, "Motormetal", followed by "Metal Galera" in 2020.

Band members

Current members
Real members
 Detonator (portrayed by Bruno Sutter) – vocals 
 Metal Avenger (portrayed by Marco Antônio Alves) – bass guitar , lead guitar 
 Red Head Hammett (portrayed by Franco Fanti) – rhythm guitar 

Fictional members
 Headmaster (portrayed by Adriano Silva) – rhythm guitar
 Jimmy the Hammer (portrayed by Felipe Torres) – drums

Former members
 Blondie Hammett (portrayed by Fausto Fanti) – lead guitar, rhythm guitar

Live/session musicians
 Straupelator (portrayed by Fernando Lima) – drums 
 El Covero (portrayed by Igor Cavalera) – drums 
 El Perro Loco (portrayed by Ricardo Confessori) – drums 
 El Mudo (portrayed by Marco Klein) – bass guitar

Discography
Studio albums
 2005 – Gates of Metal Fried Chicken of Death
 2009 – Good Blood Headbanguers

Live/video album
 2017 – Live Metal Espancation

Singles

See also
 Hermes & Renato
 Spinal Tap
 Bad News
 Tenacious D
 Nanowar of Steel
 Catarrhal Noise
 Dethklok

References

External links
 

Television characters introduced in 2004
Musical groups established in 2004
Musical groups disestablished in 2012
Musical groups reestablished in 2016
Bands with fictional stage personas
Fictional characters invented for recorded music
Comedy rock musical groups
American heavy metal musical groups
American hard rock musical groups
American thrash metal musical groups
American power metal musical groups
American glam metal musical groups
American speed metal musical groups
Brazilian parodists
Fictional musical groups
Fictional American people
EMI Records artists
Musical quintets
Parody musicians
Male characters in television